George William Alberti (1723 – 3 September 1758) was a German essayist and theologian, who spent many years in England.

Biography
He was born at Osterode am Harz in 1723, and studied philosophy and theology under Heumann and Oporin at Göttingen, where he graduated in 1745. He spent some years in England. He became minister of Tundern in Hanover, and died there on 3 September 1758.

Works
He published:
Diss. de Pseudothaumaturgis Pharaonis, 1744
De Imputabilitate Somni (graduation thesis), 1745
Some Thoughts on the Essay on Natural Religion, 1747
Aufr. Nachricht von der Rel. . . . der Quäker, 1750
Briefe betreffend den allerneuesten Zustand der Rel. und der Wissenschaften in Gross-Britannien, 1752–4

References

German essayists
German Protestant clergy
1723 births
1758 deaths
German male essayists